The 2008 Allstate 400 at the Brickyard, the 15th running of the event, was the twentieth race of the 2008 NASCAR Sprint Cup season and the fifteenth NASCAR race at the Indianapolis Motor Speedway (IMS). It was also the first race under the ESPN/ABC section of the TV coverage for the 2008 season. The 160-lap,  event was raced on July 27 at the  Indianapolis Motor Speedway located in Speedway, Indiana (a separate town surrounded by Indiana's state capital). Along with ESPN, the IMS Radio Network, working with Performance Racing Network, provided radio coverage (along with Sirius Satellite Radio) with both broadcasts starting at 1 PM US EDT.

The race was deemed a "disaster" for NASCAR, Goodyear, and Indianapolis. Due to the new Car of Tomorrow, the surface at the Indianapolis Motor Speedway, and problems with Goodyear tires, NASCAR was forced to throw competition cautions every 10–12 laps; an average of just 9 green flag laps were run during the race. Tires started to explode if the race was allowed to continue past that distance. Even at that distance, tires were down to the cords/nylon base. At the end of the race, every tire that Goodyear had brought to the track for the weekend had been used and were no longer usable.

The race was starting to rival the Daytona 500 in terms of the biggest race of the NASCAR season before the tire problems at this race. Since this race, attendance has dropped from a 257,000+ sell out to an estimated 100,000 at the 2010 race. By the 2013 race, the last year NASCAR tracked attendance, it dropped to 70,000.

Qualifying
Jimmie Johnson held off Mark Martin to win the pole position.  Bill Elliott, after starting the first 14 races at Indianapolis Motor Speedway, failed in his final run to do so, as he retired following the season.

OP: qualified via owners points

PC: qualified as past champion

PR: provisional

QR: via qualifying race

* - had to qualify on time

Failed to qualify: Bill Elliott (#21), Stanton Barrett (#50), Johnny Sauter (#08), Tony Raines (#34).

Race

In pre-race practice, teams realized that the tires provided for the race wore down quickly, due to the abrasive course at Indianapolis and the different characteristics of the fifth-generation car that was being used for the first time at Indianapolis.  Concerns led NASCAR to implement caution periods after ten laps for tire wear, a procedure NASCAR debuted at 1969 Talladega 500, which had a driver boycott over tire wear issues, and NASCAR called cautions after a specific time in order to allow teams to pit and change tires.

For Indianapolis, the cautions would be called between 10–12 laps.  Because of an accident involving Michael Waltrip on Lap 4, the first competition yellow would not wave until Lap 14 for a crash when Kurt Busch lost the car off of Turn 1, hitting Kevin Harvick in the process. The only other non-competition yellow came halfway through the race when Brian Vickers' Toyota had its engine fail.  Some drivers compared the racing to the roots of NASCAR with ten-lap heat races, as nine competition cautions and the two incidents combined effectively led to ten "heat races" were thrown with the final sprint being a "feature" race.  Jimmie Johnson won the race after a battle with Carl Edwards after various teams attempted a two-tire stop in what effectively had become the caution leading to the final shootout, similar to the NASCAR Sprint All-Star Race.

Numerous drivers would suffer tire failures during the race. Dale Earnhardt Jr. would be the first on lap 26, blowing a right rear tire while leading the race. Just 3 laps later, Juan Pablo Montoya would blow a tire coming off of turn 2. ESPN reported major tire cording on Jeff Gordon. On lap 47, Carl Edwards reported on the radion that he had a right rear tire problem. Just seconds later on the same lap, Matt Kenseth would spin on the backstretch with a right rear tire failure, causing major damage to the right side of the car. ESPN reported Kyle Busch had some tire problems on lap 65. After that, tires would show a little bit of improvement, even though the tires still showed major cording. Throughout the race, drivers expressed their disappointment at the events that had occurred prior and during the event, with Matt Kenseth saying in the garage "It's a really, really disappointing situation. You know, this is one of the biggest races in the year, to never have this car here, before or not come into an open test and then working on this things working the tires, it's pretty darn disappointing... I feel bad for the fans and everything, when we're running three quarters speed because we're worried the tires are going to fall off and we got them blowing every 8 laps. I'm pretty disappointed." NASCAR president Mike Helton would publicly announce that NASCAR threw out more competition cautions than expected. Many NASCAR fans compare it to the 2005 United States Grand Prix tire debacle, when tires blowing out became a major concern for drivers. Some also say that this race was another incident that would cause the decline of NASCAR's popularity.

Results

Post-race
Two days following the running of the race, NASCAR VP of competition Robin Pemberton formally apologized for the problems, saying that it did not go to IMS with the correct car-tire combination.  To rectify those problems, Goodyear staged two additional tire tests at Indy in the fall, the first with only three teams as per the tiremaker's policy September 22 and 23; the other with as many as 12 teams on October 7 and 8 to detect what might have gone wrong and test a new tire to be used for the 2009 race. A total of 7 tests were conducted in preparation for the 2009 race.

The results of these tests indicated an increased amount of load and slip on the right rear tire caused the particle debris to be smaller than anticipated.  This prevented rubber from adhering to the track and prevented tire wear from improving as the race progressed.

Legacy 
Many fans have pointed to this race to the overall decline of the Brickyard 400 in general. By 2021, NASCAR eventually moved the race to the Speedway's road course.

See also
2005 United States Grand Prix – a similar situation at the same track during the 2005 Formula One race
1969 Talladega 500 – the first race at Talladega, which suffered a similar situation

References

External links
 2008 Allstate 400 At The Brickyard on racing reference

Allstate 400 at the Brickyard
Allstate 400 at the Brickyard
NASCAR races at Indianapolis Motor Speedway
NASCAR controversies